Işıklar  is a village in Mut district of  Mersin Province, Turkey. At  its situated in the Toros Mountains to the west of  Göksu River. The population of Işıklar was 632  as of 2012. Main economic activity is agriculture and animal husbandry.

References

Villages in Mut District